The Golden Sheaf Award for Ruth Shaw (Best of Saskatchewan) production is presented by the Yorkton Film Festival.

History
In 1947 the Yorkton Film Council was founded.  The first Yorkton Film Festival was held in 1950  During the first few festivals, the films were adjudicated by audience participation through ballot casting and winners were awarded 'Certificates of Merit' by the film council.  In 1958 the film council established the Yorkton Film Festival Golden Sheaf Award for the category 'Best of Festival', awarded to the best overall film of the festival.  As of 2020, the Golden Sheaf Award categories included: Main Entry Categories, Accompanying Categories, Craft Categories, and Special Awards. 

In 1994 the Golden Sheaf Award for Best of Saskatchewan was added as an accompanying category. In 2013 the categories' name was changed from Best of Saskatchewan to the Ruth Shaw (Best of Saskatchewan) award to honour Ruth Shaw who had served on the festival's board for over five decades.  The winner of this award is determined by a panel of jurors chosen by the film council to select the best overall film of the festival produced in Saskatchewan.  This Golden Sheaf Award is a cash award open to all Saskatchewan productions.

Winners

1990s

2000s

2010s

2020s

References

Awards established in 1994
Yorkton Film Festival awards